Healing is a 2014 English-language Australian drama film produced by PointBlank Pictures and directed by Craig Monahan and co-written with Alison Nisselle. The film stars Hugo Weaving, Robert Taylor, Xavier Samuel, Justine Clarke, Laura Brent and Anthony Hayes. The story follows the slow social and inner healing of a prisoner as he rehabilitates an injured bird at a rural Victorian correctional centre with the aid of a caring correctional officer. The film's description line is "Inspired by true events, HEALING is a story of redemption, the discovery of hope and the healing of the spirit - in the most unlikely place for the most unlikely men."

Plot 
Viktor Kahdem (Don Hany), is an Iranian-Australian criminal, and is being is transferred to the Won Wron Correctional Centre, a  low-security prison farm situated in rural Victoria, to serve the final stretch of his prison sentence. Once there, he quickly attracts the attention of Matt Perry (Hugo Weaving), a correctional officer at the prison. One day not long after his arrival, Khadem and Perry are on a work detail together when they discover an injured wedge-tail eagle trapped in a wire fence. Perry notices Kahdem's almost immediate affection and care of the bird. Soon, Perry has set up a small aviary inside which the inmate can rehabilitate the bird, noting that as he aids the recovery of the bird he can also heal himself. Kahdem is the first prisoner to undergo this new program. Whilst training the wedge-tail eagle, which Perry has named Yasmine, inmate and officer develop a strong fraternal relationship and Kahdem opens up about his past to his new friend.

After hearing about his past and finding out that he has living family despite never having had a visit, Perry becomes motivated to assist Kahdem in his rehabilitation and intervenes to invite his son to the prison for a visit. Convinced against his initial refusal of the offer, Yousef (Dimitri Baveas) eventually takes up the invitation to attend the prison and pay a visit his incarcerated father.  Unexpectedly, the visit turns sour after sensitive issues are touched upon. Kahdem is angered and keeps his fist clenched in frustration, whilst Yousef stands to shout at him. Eventually Yousef leaves in rage, hurting Kahdem and his morale.

Perry invites a local wildlife expert named Glynis (Jane Menelaus) to assist in Yasmine's training, and she warns Viktor that he must prepare Yasmine for her eventual release back into the wild. The bird, she reminds him, is only in the aviary for wildlife rehabilitation. Whilst this is all occurring, other inmates such as Paul (Xavier Samuel) begin rehabilitating other injured birds as part of the program pioneered by Perry. Paul's injured bird is a majestic white owl with whom he shows a great devotion.

The friendship developed between Kahdem and Perry, as well as the work Kahdem does with Yasmine, allows him to truly find inner happiness through the meaning brought to his life. The film ends with Yasmine's full rehabilitation and release into the wild and Kahdem's subsequent release from prison.

Cast 

 Hugo Weaving as Matt Perry, an officer at the Won Wron Correctional Centre
 Robert Taylor as Vander
 Xavier Samuel as Paul, a young inmate at the Won Wron Correctional Centre
 Justine Clarke as Michelle
 Laura Brent as Stacey
 Anthony Hayes as Warren
 Tony Martin
 Dimitri Baveas as Yousef, the protagonist's estranged son.
 Don Hany as Viktor Khadem, an Iranian-Australian inmate at the Won Wron Correctional Centre (protagonist)
 Tony Briggs as Travis
 Mark Leonard Winter as Shane
 Leanne Campbell as Shane's alcoholic Mum
 Jane Menelaus as Glynis, a local wildlife professional.
 Richard Stables as Ted
 Paul Bonet as Mr Anderson

Production

Filming 
Filming began on 18 February 2013 and took place in different parts of the Australian state of Victoria over a few months. The setting was produced in three locations; Healesville, Kyneton, and Melbourne. All film locations are Victorian in an attempt to replicate the landscapes of the true story (on which Healing is based), which also took place in a regional Victorian prison.

Healing is only the second film to be produced by PointBlank Pictures.

Release

Box Office 
The film was released on 8 May 2014 in Australia, on 24 July in New Zealand, and on 25 May in the US at a Seattle International Film Festival. It opened at #12 in Australia, grossing $116,928 in its first week at the box office, and it grossed $282,258 worldwide.

Anchor Bay Entertainment was responsible for the North American distribution of the film. The poor Box Office performance in Australia and abroad was a major let down to a star-studded cast, many of whom had generally been involved with successful films and franchises. Despite bringing in highly costed and popular actors such as Weaving (from Lord of the Rings fame) and Samuel (from A Few Best Men fame and The Twilight Saga), the film struggled to draw too much attention. Considering the profile of these actors and the public campaign to advertise the film, the Box Office digits were a failure.

Reception 
Reviews of the film were relatively unfavourable, particularly considering that it received accolades and awards for its low budget. Positive reviews of the film were generally acknowledgements of the overall theme of the narrative and its plot. Sandra Hall wrote "The parallels between injured bird and flawed man work brilliantly in Healing." in the Sydney Morning Herald. Matthew Thoomey from the ABC similarly adds,"It has something to say about the importance of therapy (whatever the form) and the power of forgiveness. There's much to reflect upon." Not all reviews on this topic were favourable,"Supple, meandering and sometimes besotted with the beauty of its own creations, the screenplay tries to embrace several inter-related themes, but fumbles the process." Commented Andrew L. Urban from the Urban Cinefile.

The criticisms of the film are mostly directed towards its cliched and television-styled script as well as its overuse of its key allegorical link; the healing of the bird as a symbol of the protagonists "healing" and rehabilitation.  Fo example, Tom Cliff writes "Stock characters and clunky, heavy-handed storytelling keeps Healing, ...well and truly tethered to the ground. ...Despite the unique premise and setting, however, the film soon grows dreary and unfocused — leaving an unfortunate cast of workman local actors with no opportunity to soar."

Accolades
Healing received nine nominations and three wins (all of which were by Craig Monohan) following its release in 2014. The following list outlines 

 David Hirschfelder was nominated for Best Original Music Score at the 2015 Australian Academy of Cinema and Television Arts (AACTA) Awards in 2015
 Craig Monohan was nominated and won the 2015 Australian Directors' Guild Flinder's Series Award.
 Don Hany was nominated for the Best Actor in the 2015 Australian Film Critics Association Awards.
 Healing was nominated for the 2014 Australian Screen Sound Guild 2014 award for the Feature Film Soundtrack of the Year.
 The Film Critics Circle of Australia Awards 2015 nominated:
Don Hany for Best Actor, 
David Hirschfelder for Best Music Score, and 
Justine Clarke for Best Actress - Supporting Role.
 Craig Monohan was nominated and won the Audience Award at the 2014 Rencontres Internationales du Cinéma des Antipodes.
 Craig Monohan was nominated and won the Director's Choice Award for Best Foreign Film at the 2015 Sedona International Film Festival.
Healing was also awarded the 2014 Gadens Queensland Literary Award for Feature Film Script before the film's release.

References

External links 
 

2014 films
Films set in Victoria (Australia)
Films set in Melbourne
Films shot in Melbourne
2014 drama films
Australian drama films
Films scored by David Hirschfelder
2010s English-language films